Saint Louis Cemetery is a Catholic cemetery on Barret Avenue in Louisville, Kentucky.

History
The Saint Louis Cemetery performed its first services in 1811 behind the Saint Louis Church at 10th and Main Street in Louisville, Kentucky. In 1831, the Saint Louis Church and the gravesites were moved to the Catholic section of the Western Cemetery. The graves were moved again in 1867 when the Saint Louis Cemetery was established. It was incorporated on May 28, 1972. It was laid out by local designer Benjamin Grove.

Notable burials

As of 2016, there are 48,000 people buried at Saint Louis Cemetery.

 Alma Kellner – 9-year old victim of convicted murderer Hans Schmidt

See also
 List of cemeteries in Kentucky

References

Cemeteries in Kentucky
1867 establishments in Kentucky